Sabira Merchant (nee Vazirali) (born 4 August 1942) is a Miss India trainer and actor based in Mumbai. She is a top etiquette trainer in India.

Background
Merchant was born in Bombay to Goolshen and Abdulhusein M. Thariani, the fifth child. She was adopted by her maternal uncle and given the surname, Vazirali. She was sent to a finishing school in Switzerland. She is married to Chotu Merchant.

Career
She started acting as a theatre artiste in Bombay. In the 70’s, she became very popular on the television with her show What’s the good word?, which ran for a record 15 years on Doordarshan. The theme music for the show was Glen Miller's version of American Patrol

She later became a trainer and was very successful. She played the enchantress, Madame Manaeksha, in the BBC production Six steps to happiness. She has trained famous celebrities like Priyanka Chopra, Lara Dutta and many more on international beauty pageants.

Her memoir, A Full Life, was published in 2022.

References

External links
 sabira merchant.net

1942 births
Actresses from Mumbai
Living people
21st-century Indian actresses
Indian Ismailis
Khoja Ismailism
Etiquette writers
Gujarati people